Shrikant Molangiri (born 20 April 1989) is an Indian professional footballer who plays as a midfielder for DSK Shivajians in the I-League.

Career
Born in Pune, Maharashtra, Molangiri began his career with local club, Deccan Rovers, and also represented Maharashtra in the Santosh Trophy. He soon moved to DSK Shivajians where, in 2015, he was adjudged the best player during the Pune Super Division season.

On 30 January 2016, Molangiri made his professional debut for the club in the I-League against Mohun Bagan. He came on as a 55th-minute substitute for Milan Singh as DSK Shivajians lost the match 2–0.

I-League statistics

References

External links 
 DSK Shivajians Profile.

1989 births
Living people
Footballers from Pune
Indian footballers
DSK Shivajians FC players
Association football midfielders
I-League players
Maharashtra football team players